U.S. Route 177 (US-177) is a spur of U.S. Route 77. It currently runs for 233 miles (375 km) from South Haven, Kansas at US-81 to Madill, Oklahoma at US-70. It passes through the states of Kansas and Oklahoma.

Route description

Oklahoma

US-177 begins concurrent with State Highway 199 at the US-70 junction near Madill, Oklahoma. From this point, it heads northwest, serving as the southern terminus of State Highway 1 and the main street of Mannsville. The route turns northward in Dickson, where it splits from SH-199. East of Gene Autry, it is the eastern end of SH-53. US-177 then runs through the Chickasaw National Recreation Area and the town of Sulphur, where it has a brief concurrency with SH-7. On the north side of Sulphur lies a partial interchange with the Chickasaw Turnpike.

US-177 continues north into western Garvin County, serving as the eastern terminus of SH-29 and crossing SH-19 in Stratford. The route then cuts across the narrow eastern tip of McClain County, where it begins concurrencies with both State Highway 59 and State Highway 3W. The three highways then cross the Canadian River into Pottawatomie County, where they meet SH-39 at a four-way stop in Asher.

Near unincorporated Pearson, SH-59 splits off to the east. US-177/SH-3W continue north to Tecumseh, where they have an interchange with SH-9. At this interchange, US-270 joins the concurrency. The three highways run along the west side of Shawnee. At the Interstate 40 interchange, SH-3W reunites with SH-3E, and the unified SH-3 (along with US-270) follows I-40. US-177 continues northward alone.

After crossing into Lincoln County, US-177 meets US-62 in Jacktown. Just west of Warwick, it meets SH-66 (old Route 66), and then passes under Interstate 44 (the Turner Turnpike), with no interchange. I-44 is accessed through the SH-66 – Wellston (Exit 157) interchange. US-177 then continues north, connecting to the town of Carney via SH-40A, the shortest state highway in Oklahoma. West of Tryon, it intersects State Highway 105. It then enters Payne County just south of the Cimarron River.

In Payne County, US-177 almost immediately passes through the town of Perkins. North of that community, it has a one-mile (1.6 km) concurrency with State Highway 33. It then passes through the county seat, Stillwater, the home of Oklahoma State University. There, it intersects SH-51. North of Stillwater, it serves as the western terminus of the Cimarron Turnpike Spur. Farther north, in Noble County, it crosses US-64 and the mainline of the Cimarron Turnpike. It then has a four mile (6.4 km) concurrency with State Highway 15.

US-177 then enters its final county in Oklahoma, Kay County. It serves Ponca City, where it begins a wrong-way concurrency with its parent, US-77, as well as US-60 (which is signed the "correct" direction). The routes split near Tonkawa. US-177 then runs through Blackwell and Braman. North of Braman, the route is the northernmost exit on Interstate 35 in Oklahoma. Six miles (9.7 km) after the I-35 junction, US-177 leaves Oklahoma.

Kansas

US-177 then enters Sumner County, Kansas near Hunnewell. Only 4 mi (6.4 km) north of the state line, US-177 ends at US-81 in downtown South Haven, Kansas. The terminus is less than a mile from the western terminus of US-166 (also on US-81) north of town.

History
Originally, the highway functioned as a shortcut for Wichita to Oklahoma City traffic traveling between US-81 at South Haven, KS and US-77 at Three Sands Jct, Oklahoma (where US-77 and State Highway 156 intersect outside Marland, Oklahoma today).

During the 1960s, the highway was extended south to Madill, Oklahoma, replacing the entire length of State Highway 40 from Ponca City, Oklahoma to then-US-66 (near Wellston, Oklahoma) and the portion of State Highway 18 between Shawnee, Oklahoma and Madill, Oklahoma (the segment between US-66 and Shawnee was constructed at this time).  Vestiages of these highways remain in spur routes State Highway 40A, located entirely in Carney, Oklahoma and State Highway 18A, located south of Sulphur, Oklahoma.

During this extension, the alignments of US-77 and US-177 were altered in North Central Oklahoma as follows:

US-77 was relocated to run north from Three Sands Jct to Tonkawa, Oklahoma on the former route of US-177, then east on US-60 to Ponca City, Oklahoma.  This also involved a new US-60 alignment between Tonkawa, Oklahoma and Ponca City, Oklahoma, where US-60, US-77, and US-177 all overlap on the same highway (which results in northbound US-77, eastbound US-60, and southbound US-177 traffic running in the same compass direction: east).

Junction list

State Highway 40A

State Highway 40A is an  highway in Lincoln County, Oklahoma. It is numbered after State Highway 40, the predecessor to US-177. It is the shortest state highway in Oklahoma.

The highway connects US-177 to the town of Carney, Oklahoma. It has a 25 mph (40 km/h) speed limit.

See also

Related routes
U.S. Route 77
U.S. Route 277
U.S. Route 377

References

External links

 Endpoints of U.S. Highway 177

United States Numbered Highway System
U.S. Highways in Kansas
U.S. Highways in Oklahoma
1
U.S. Route 177
U.S. Route 177
U.S. Route 177
U.S. Route 177
U.S. Route 177
U.S. Route 177
U.S. Route 177
U.S. Route 177
U.S. Route 177
U.S. Route 177
U.S. Route 177
U.S. Route 177